The James Simpson-Roosevelt Asiatic Expedition was a 1925 expedition sponsored by the Field Museum of Natural History and organized by Kermit Roosevelt and his brother Theodore Roosevelt, Jr.

Finance and organization

James Simpson (1874–1939), a Field Museum trustee who had first been elected to that position in 1921, financed the expedition but remained in Chicago. The expedition's main participants were the two Roosevelt brothers, the naturalist George K. Cherrie, the photographer C. Suydam Cutting, two experienced hunters from Bandipur and several other Hindustani-speaking men who joined the expedition in Srinagar. The Roosevelts secured permission from the Chinese government to cross the Himalayas into Chinese territory.

Itinerary and results
George Cherrie went by freighter with the expedition's equipment, along with four cougar hounds, to Karachi. Theodore and Kermit Roosevelt with Suydam Cutting departed from New York City on 11 April 1925 aboard SS Leviathan. In England they secured, with the help of the Soviet envoy Rakovsky, permission to enter the Russian Pamirs. Stopping in Paris to buy presents for Asians they might encounter, the three Americans went by rail to Marseilles and then by ship to Bombay, arriving on May 11. On May 19 the expedition left Srinagar with a caravan of 60 ponies. Via the Zoji Pass they reached Leh about June 1 and then collected several specimens of the barhal and the Tibetan antelope. For more than 2 weeks, the expedition journeyed through the high Himalayas and lost 14 of their 60 ponies, before reaching Sanju Bazaar in eastern Turkestan on July 5. A few days later the party reached Yarkand, where they split up. Cutting went northwest to Kashgar; Cherrie collected birds, small mammals and reptiles in central Turkestan; the Roosevelts with the two Bandipur shikaris went to the Tian Shan Mountains for big game hunting.

In the Tian Shan range, the Roosevelts shot and collected specimens of Altai wapiti, Tian Shan sheep, Siberian roe deer, Asiatic brown bear, and a comprehensive museum group of Tian Shan ibex. After departing the Tian Shan Mountains, the Roosevelts arrived in Kashgar on September 28 and then in the Russian Pamirs successfully shot and collected a museum group  of Marco Polo sheep. The Roosevelts returned to British India via the Khunjerab Pass and arrived in Kashmir on November 3.

Cherrie and Cutting met in the Tian Shan region on September 7.

Cutting returned directly to the United States and after some difficulty and delays Cherrie managed the successful return of the baggage to the United States.

The Roosevelt brothers met their wives in Srinagar in early November and then after some more shooting and collecting of specimens in British India, the party returned to the United States.

Discovery and earlier collections
On this expedition a new species of skink, Eutropis allapallensis, was discovered; Karl P. Schmidt described the expedition's preserved skink specimen, which was collected in the Allapalli Forest, and named the new species Mabuya allapallensis.

References

External links

Pack animals of the expedition fording the Shyok-River (Pamir) 1925 Wide World Photo, James Simpson Roosevelt Field Museum Expedition to Central Asia :... News Photo, Getty Images
Tiger-hunt after return from Tibet in Nepal, James Simpson Roosevelt Field Museum Expedition to Central Asia :... News Photo, Getty Images
Kermit Roosevelt and his wife Belle at the tiger hunt with a killed tiger, Nepal, 1925, James Simpson Roosevelt Field Museum Expedition to Central Asia :... News Photo, Getty Images

1925 in science
Asian expeditions
Exploration of Central Asia
Field Museum of Natural History